Communism in Germany may refer to:
The Bavarian Soviet Republic
The German Democratic Republic (East Germany)
The many communist parties in Germany